Linlithgow railway station is a railway station serving the town of Linlithgow in West Lothian, Scotland.

History 

Linlithgow station was opened by the Edinburgh and Glasgow Railway on 21 February 1842. It once featured an east-facing bay platform and a small goods yard, where the carpark is today. The station also had a railway hotel; The Star and Garter Hotel which was involved in a devastating fire in October 2010.

Photographs of the station taken in 1845 are believed to be the oldest photographic images of a railway subject anywhere in the world.

The building is Category C listed by Historic Scotland due to it being one of the only two surviving (with Croy) stations of the original Edinburgh and Glasgow Railway.

Services 

The station is served by trains on the main Edinburgh to Glasgow via Falkirk High main line and via the Cumbernauld Line, and the Edinburgh - Stirling - Dunblane routes, with half-hourly calls each way on all routes on Mondays to Saturdays (hourly to Dunblane on Sundays). Services via Cumbernauld terminate at Falkirk Grahamston in the evenings. The one return weekday  to Glasgow commuter service also stops here in each direction.

On Sundays, the Edinburgh - Glasgow service is half hourly and the Dunblane to Edinburgh one is hourly.

Electrification 
As part of the Edinburgh to Glasgow Improvement Programme, the line through the station has been electrified and the platforms extended.

References

Sources 

 
 
 
 RAILSCOT on Edinburgh and Glasgow Railway
 Linlithgow station on navigable OS map

External links
Video footage of Linlithgow Railway Station

Railway stations in West Lothian
Former North British Railway stations
Railway stations in Great Britain opened in 1842
Railway stations served by ScotRail
Linlithgow
Listed railway stations in Scotland
Category C listed buildings in West Lothian